Michael J. Trombetta (born October 26, 1966, in Baltimore, Maryland) is an American Thoroughbred horse trainer who began his training career in 1989 and who was the Maryland Trainer of the Year in 2005. Trombetta gained a national profile when Sweetnorthernsaint was the favorite for the 2006 Kentucky Derby. After coming in seventh in the Kentucky Derby, Sweetnorthernsaint later finished second in the 2006 Preakness. Trombetta returned to Churchill Downs to compete in the 2019 Kentucky Derby with Live Oak Plantation's colt, Win Win Win.

References 

1966 births
Living people
American racehorse trainers
Sportspeople from Baltimore